Le Schuylkill is a high-rise residential building in Monaco.

Location
It is located at 19, Boulevard de Suisse in Saint Michel, Monaco.

History
The construction of the building was completed in 1970. It was designed in the modernist architectural style. It is 78 metres high, with twenty-five storeys. It is the fourteenth tallest building in Monaco.

It was owned by heiress Hélène Pastor through her eponymous real estate company. Her daughter, Sylvia Pastor, lived in this building with her companion, the Polish businessman and honorary consul Wojciech Janowski. Another notable resident was Michael Pearson, 4th Viscount Cowdray.

References

Residential skyscrapers in Monaco
Modernist architecture in Monaco
Buildings and structures completed in 1970
Pastor family